The 1886–87 British Home Championship was the fourth international football tournament between the British Home Nations. Played during the second half of the 1886–87 football season, the competition was won by Scotland for the fourth consecutive time (although they had once shared victory with England). Ireland also achieved their first placing above the bottom of the table, finishing above Wales due to victory at home in their final match.

England and Ireland began the competition in early February, England comprehensively defeating their visitors 7–0 in Sheffield and taking the initial tournament lead. Scotland joined them with a strong victory over Ireland in their first game, but England again seized the top slot with their own defeat of Wales. In their final match, Ireland succeeded in achieving their first ever international victory with a 4–1 win over Wales in Belfast, to put them in third position. England and Scotland then played a deciding match in Blackburn, Scotland only just running out 3–2 winners after a very tough game. In the final match, Scotland beat Wales in Wrexham to outstrip England's points total and win the trophy.

Table

Results

Winning squad

References

Brit
Brit
Brit
Brit
Home Championship
British Home Championships